The Damned is a 1947 French drama film directed by René Clément. It was entered into the 1947 Cannes Film Festival. The film is notable for its depiction of the interior of a wartime submarine and for its tracking shots through the length of the U-boat.

Plot
As Germany is in the throes of losing World War II, a number of wealthy Nazis and some French sympathizers head for South America in a German submarine leaving from Oslo. The film's narrator is a French doctor (Henri Vidal) who has been kidnapped to tend a sick woman, Hilde Garosi (Florence Marly), the wife of one man and the lover of another, both aboard. The doctor realizes he will be murdered at any point once the woman has recovered so he tries various stratagems to escape. All fail.

The mission slowly disintegrates as the war ends and its reasons for being dissipate, with some passengers either trying to escape or committing suicide. Forster (Jo Dest) tries to continue the mission even after Berlin has fallen and orders have gone out for all U-boats to surrender at the nearest port. Part of the crew finally mutinies against the insane ones still fighting the war. The doctor ends up alone on the Nazi sub for days writing his memoirs until an American ship rescues him and finally sinks his infamous abode at sea.

Cast
 Marcel Dalio as Larga (as Dalio)
 Henri Vidal as Docteur Guilbert
 Florence Marly as Hilde Garosi
 Fosco Giachetti as Garosi
 Paul Bernard as Couturier
 Jo Dest as Forster (as Jodest)
 Michel Auclair as Willy Morus
  as Ingrid Ericksen
 Andreas von Halberstadt (as A. Von Halberstadt)
 Lucien Hector as Ericksen
 Jean Lozach (as Lozach)
 Karl Münch (as Karl Munch)

Restoration
In 2013, the Cohen Film Collection released The Damned on Blu-ray and DVD in the US, using a restoration carried out by the French distributor, Gaumont.

References

External links
 

1947 films
1947 drama films
1940s French-language films
1940s German-language films
French black-and-white films
French drama films
Films directed by René Clément
World War II submarine films
Palme d'Or winners
1940s French films